Rashwan is an Egyptian surname.

Notable people with this surname include:
 Ahmed Rashwan (born 1969), Egyptian director
 Diaa Rashwan (born 1960), Egyptian politician
 Hany Rashwan (born 1990), Egyptian businessman
 Ibrahim Rashwan (born 1978), Egyptian volleyball player
 Mohamed Ali Rashwan (born 1956), Egyptian judoka

See also
 Rashvan, Iranian village